It's a Great Life is a 1943 black-and-white film and is the 13th of the 28 Blondie films. It is one of only two movies in the series that did not feature "Blondie" in the title (the other, Footlight Glamour, was released later the same year).

Plot
At home, Dagwood Bumstead mishears his boss, Mr. Dithers, giving him an order on the phone. He is to negotiate a price to buy a certain house from its owner (who also has a horse for sale). With the bedlam in the house, Mr. Dithers has to raise his voice to be heard. Dagwood only clearly hears the end of the call when Dithers states he is "getting a little hoarse." Dagwood aims to please his boss.

At the seller's, he overhears the seller on the phone about to accept an offer.  Dagwood thinks it's about the horse, and buys Reggie.

The seller will not take Reggie back.  Complications ensue when Dagwood tries to sell him. (The horse is rather intelligent; he and the Bumsteads have also grown fond of each other.)

Cast

 Penny Singleton as Blondie
 Arthur Lake as Dagwood
 Larry Simms as Baby Dumpling
 Daisy as Daisy the Dog
 Reggie as Reggie the Horse
 Hugh Herbert as Timothy Brewster 
 Jonathan Hale as J.C. Dithers 
 Danny Mummert as Alvin Fuddle
 Alan Dinehart as Collender Martin
 Douglas Leavitt as Bromley
 Irving Bacon as Mailman
 Marjorie Ann Mutchie as Cookie
 Emory Parnell as Policeman
 Ray Walker as Salesman

External links
 
 
 
 

1943 films
Columbia Pictures films
American black-and-white films
Films directed by Frank R. Strayer
Blondie (film series) films
1943 comedy films
American comedy films
1940s English-language films
1940s American films